Gary William Aldcorn (born March 7, 1935) is a Canadian former professional ice hockey left winger who played 226 games in the National Hockey League for the Boston Bruins, Detroit Red Wings, and Toronto Maple Leafs between 1956 and 1961. Over his NHL career, Aldcorn scored 41 regular-season goals and one goal in the Stanley Cup playoffs. Internationally Aldcorn played for the Canadian national team at the 1965 World Championships.

Prior to his career in the NHL, Aldcorn won the 1954 Allan Cup national senior ice hockey championship as a member of the Winnipeg Maroons, then won the 1955 Memorial Cup national junior ice hockey championship as a member of the Toronto Marlboros.

Career statistics

Regular season and playoffs

International

Coaching statistics
Season  Team                   Lge  Type        GP  W  L T OTL Pct   
1967-68 St. Boniface Mohawks   MSHL Player-Head 24 10 13 1   0 0.43750  
1969-70 Canadian National Team Intl Assistant

Awards and achievements 
 1956: President's Cup (WHL) Championship
 1956: Edinburgh Cup Championship
 Honoured Member of the Manitoba Hockey Hall of Fame

External links

Gary Aldcorn’s biography at Manitoba Hockey Hall of Fame

1935 births
Living people
Boston Bruins players
Canadian expatriate ice hockey players in the United States
Canadian ice hockey left wingers
Detroit Red Wings players
Ice hockey people from Saskatchewan
People from Shaunavon, Saskatchewan
Rochester Americans players
Toronto Maple Leafs players
Toronto Marlboros players
Winnipeg Maroons players
Winnipeg Monarchs players
Winnipeg Warriors (minor pro) players